The Town of Eagle is the Statutory Town that is the county seat of Eagle County, Colorado, United States. The town population was 7,511 at the 2020 United States Census, a +15.41% increase since the 2010 United States Census. Eagle is the part of the Edwards, CO Micropolitan Statistical Area.

The town has an extensive trail system for mountain biking, hiking and trail running.

History
A post office called Eagle has been in operation since 1891. The town takes its name from Eagle County, which itself takes its name from the Eagle River. Eagle was incorporated in 1905.

Geography
Eagle is located west of the center of Eagle County in the valley of the Eagle River, a west-flowing tributary of the Colorado River. The town limits extend southward up the valley of Brush Creek. U.S. Route 6 passes through the center of town, and Interstate 70 passes through the northern side, with access from Exit 147.
 
At the 2020 United States Census, the town had a total area of  including  of water.

Climate
The climate of Eagle is characterized by cold winters, hot summers, and relatively little precipitation. Under the Köppen climate classification, Eagle has a warm-summer humid continental climate (Dfb), but it is borderline semi-arid (BSk) due to low rainfall. As a consequence of the city's high elevation, temperatures drop sharply after sunset.

Demographics

As of the 2010 census, there were 6,508 people, 2,183 households, and 1,666 families residing in the town. The racial makeup of the town was 87.3% white, 0.4% African American, 0.8% Native American, 0.8% Asian, 0.02% Pacific Islander, 7.9% some other race, and 2.6% from two or more races. Hispanic or Latino of any race were 22.3% of the population.

There were 2,183 households, out of which 49.5% had children under the age of 18 living with them, 65.5% were headed by married couples living together, 6.7% had a female householder with no husband present, and 23.7% were non-families. 16.3% of all households were made up of individuals, and 4.1% were someone living alone who was 65 years of age or older. The average household size was 2.96 and the average family size was 3.33.

In the town, the population was spread out, with 31.7% under the age of 18, 5.8% from 18 to 24, 35.8% from 25 to 44, 22.7% from 45 to 64, and 4.1% who were 65 years of age or older. The median age was 33.8 years. For every 100 females, there were 104.5 males. For every 100 females age 18 and over, there were 102.9 males.

For the period 2010–14, the estimated median annual income for a household in the town was $81,571, and the median income for a family was $94,875. Male full-time workers had a median income of $65,156 versus $47,902 for females. The per capita income for the town was $35,426. About 2.0% of families and 4.2% of the population were below the poverty line, including 2.8% of those under age 18 and 28.2% of those age 65 or over.

Community activism
The Eagle community has an involved community, especially when big issues come up for review. In just three years, there were three referendums. In January 2010, voters defeated a  lifestyle center project called Eagle River Station. In January 2012, voters approved allowing the medical marijuana dispensary to stay in business. (The Board of Trustees originally allowed the business to open but then the new Board of Trustees decided to withdraw that permit. The owners of the marijuana dispensary then took it to the vote of the people and the business was allowed to stay open.) In May 2012, voters approved the second vote on the now  lifestyle center project still called Eagle River Station.

Transportation
Many airlines provide services from Eagle to various destinations during the ski season months, although in the low season months the airport just has services to Dallas and Denver. ECO Transit provides local transportation from Eagle to Dotsero, Gypsum, Edwards, Avon and Vail.

 Interstate 70 runs east–west connecting the town to Baltimore, Maryland, on its east end, passing through Columbus, Indianapolis, Saint Louis, Kansas City, and Denver, and ends at Interstate 15 in Utah.
 U.S. Highway 6 parallels Interstate 70 in Eagle County, running east–west from Provincetown, Massachusetts, to Bishop, California.

Union Pacific Railroad's tracks cross Eagle, linking the town to Denver, Grand Junction, and Pueblo. The closest Amtrak station is located in Glenwood Springs,  to the west, with daily service of the California Zephyr.

Bustang, Colorado's state-run bus service, connects Eagle to both Grand Junction and Denver.

Notable residents

Benjamin Kunkel (born 1972), novelist and political economist

See also

Colorado
Bibliography of Colorado
Index of Colorado-related articles
Outline of Colorado
List of counties in Colorado
List of municipalities in Colorado
List of places in Colorado
List of statistical areas in Colorado
Edwards, CO Micropolitan Statistical Area
Edwards-Glenwood Springs, CO Combined Statistical Area

References

External links

Town of Eagle website
CDOT map of the Town of Eagle
Town of Eagle tourism website -- get your official Town of Eagle Adventure Guide
Vail Valley Partnership - The Chamber and Tourism Bureau
ECO Transit

Towns in Eagle County, Colorado
Towns in Colorado
County seats in Colorado